John Ripard (born 7 March 1930) is a Maltese former sailor who competed in the 1960 Summer Olympics.

References

1930 births
Living people
Maltese male sailors (sport)
Olympic sailors of Malta
Sailors at the 1960 Summer Olympics – Star